Chang Ping-ho (born 7 April 1943) is a Taiwanese judoka. He competed in the men's middleweight event at the 1972 Summer Olympics.

References

1943 births
Living people
Taiwanese male judoka
Olympic judoka of Taiwan
Judoka at the 1972 Summer Olympics
Place of birth missing (living people)